Hyperperacera is a genus of flies in the family Empididae.

Species
H. nemoralis (Philippi, 1865)
H. philippii (Bigot, 1889)

References

Empidoidea genera
Empididae